Udea phyllostegia is a moth of the family Crambidae. It is endemic to the Hawaiian island of Oahu.

The larvae feed on Phyllostegia species.

External links

Moths described in 1946
Endemic moths of Hawaii
phyllostegia